Charles Henry Harrod (16 April 1799, Lexden, Colchester – 31 March 1885, Chiswick Urban District) was an English business tycoon, involved in the retail trade. He is best known as the founder of the highly successful and world renowned Harrods Department Store in London, which is well known today for its food halls, specialism in luxury foreign foods and its fashion and beauty departments. Harrods also retails its own exclusive brand.

Early life
At a young age, Harrod worked as a miller in Clacton, but in 1834 he moved to London where he began selling groceries in Stepney.

Harrods
In the 1840s he rented a small shop on Brompton Road, Knightsbridge, known as "Harrods". The shop sold groceries and only had a turnover of £20 per week, during the 1850s when Knightsbridge grew into one of the most fashionable parts of London.

In 1860 Charles sold the business to his son, Charles Digby Harrod. The trade at Harrods continued to grow and by 1868 the shop had sixteen staff and the turnover had risen to £1,000 per week. Harrod concentrated on encouraging wealthy people to his store and provided a personalised service for important customers. He also managed to increase trade by introducing his own brand groceries patriotically packaged in the colours of the Union Flag.

References

1799 births
1885 deaths
British retail company founders
English businesspeople in retailing
Harrods
People from Colchester
19th-century English businesspeople